Ian Eric "Occ" Occleshaw (1928-2015) was a professional tennis player and coach. He was a member of the Linton Cup team in 1947, managed Linton Cup and Wilson Cup teams on several occasions, coached Peter McNamara and Alan Stone and is one of the founders of Tennis Coaches Australia Victoria (TCAV). He worked on the Tennis Australia Development Board, was president, secretary and member of the board of TCAV.

Occleshaw died on 29 March 2015.

Career

Playing

Coaching 
Occleshaw commenced coaching in 1951. He was the head coach at Glen Iris (30 years), school coach at St Catherienes (30 years) and Corowa (35 years) owned four courts in West Coburg, was the resident pro, with Don Tregonning, at the Kooyong Lawn Tennis Club (20 years) and coached squads in the United States. He was Peter McNamara's  and Alan Stone's personal coach.

Management 
Occleshaw owned four courts in West Coburg, managed the Linton Cup team  and Wilson Cup team, conducted tournaments for the Glen Iris Recreational Club (Glen Iris' Junior tournament – 30 years), TCAV (TCAV juniors – 7 years) and the Victorian government (Victorian schoolboys/schoolgirls tournaments – 8 years). He started and ran solidarity clinics in Brunei and Fiji, was a member of the Tennis Australia Development Board (8 years), a State Selector for the VTA (20 years), president, secretary and member of the TCAV board.

Ian Occleshaw Award 
Occleshaw is the namesake of the Ian Occleshaw Award, which has been awarded by TCAV since 2014.

Ian Occleshaw Trophy 
Occleshaw is the namesake of the Ian Occleshaw Trophy, which has been awarded to the best performing Pennant team by the Glen Iris Recreational Club since 2016.

References

Australian male tennis players
1928 births
2015 deaths
Australian tennis coaches
Tennis people from Victoria (Australia)
People from Murrumbeena, Victoria